Paul Ludvig Irgens-Jensen (13 April 1894 – 11 April 1969) was a Norwegian twentieth-century composer.

Irgens-Jensen studied piano with Nils Larsen while a philology student at the University of Oslo. He began composing in 1920 and the radical nature of his work attracted some interest. Irgens-Jensen's oratorio Heimferd (for solo choir and orchestra) won first prize in a national competition, and is considered a national monument of sorts for Norway. The song Altar is one of his most familiar works.

During the Second World War, Irgens-Jensen composed several songs and orchestral works to patriotic texts; due to the restrictions imposed by the Nazis, these works had to be distributed anonymously and illegally. Irgens-Jensen is often characterized as a neo-Classical composer.

Works
Violin Sonata in B-flat (1923)
Tema con variazioni (1925)
Piano Quintet (1927)
Passacaglia (1927)
Heimferd (1930)
Der Gott und die Bajadere (1932)
Partita Sinfonica (1938)
Pastorale religioso (1939)
Symphony in D minor (1942)
Canto d'omaggio (1950)
Japanischer Frühling (1957)
Air (1959)

Discography (selected releases)
Bournemouth Symphony Orchestra, Symphony in d minor ; Air ; Passacaglia (2011)
Solveig Kringlebotn, To a Friend (2003)
Bergen Philharmonic Orchestra, Ragnhild Heiland Sørensen, Eivind Aadland, Japanischer Frühling (2002)
Trondheim Symphony Orchestra, Heimferd (1994)
Oslo Philharmonic Orchestra, Ludvig Irgens-Jensen, Tema con Variazioni - Sinfonia in Re - Japanischer Frühling (1993)
Oslo Philharmonic Orchestra, Ludvig Irgens-Jensen, Passacaglia & Partita Sinfonica · Sonata for Violin and piano (1988)

References
Music Information Centre Norway

External links
List of works supplied by the National Library of Norway 

1894 births
1969 deaths
20th-century composers
Norwegian composers
Norwegian pianists
University of Oslo alumni
20th-century pianists